Alastair Bradley Martin (March 11, 1915 – January 12, 2010) was a U.S. National Championships title winner, Tennis Hall of Fame inductee, and president of the United States Lawn Tennis Association. The New York Times attributes Martin with having helped to "forge the modern era of the Grand Slam-style game."

Alastair graduated from Princeton in 1938. Alastair was also an esteemed art collector and cultivated the Guennol Collection, which included the Guennol Stargazer and the Guennol Lioness.

References

External links
International Tennis Hall of Fame
 The Guennol collection of Mr. and Mrs. Alastair B. Martin, a fully digitized exhibition catalog from The Metropolitan Museum of Art Libraries

1915 births
2010 deaths
American male tennis players
Princeton Tigers men's tennis players
International Tennis Hall of Fame inductees